Defiance is a 2008 American war film directed by Edward Zwick set during the occupation of Belarus by Nazi Germany. The screenplay by Clayton Frohman and Zwick was based on Nechama Tec's 1993 book Defiance: The Bielski Partisans, an account of the eponymous group led by Polish Jewish brothers who saved and recruited Jews in Belarus during the Second World War. The film stars Daniel Craig as Tuvia Bielski, Liev Schreiber as Zus Bielski, Jamie Bell as Asael Bielski, and George MacKay as Aron Bielski.

Production began in early September 2007. After a limited release in the United States (e.g. Los Angeles and New York City) on December 31, 2008, it went into general release worldwide in January and February 2009.

Plot
In August 1941, Nazi Germany's  are sweeping through Eastern Europe systematically killing European Jews. Among the survivors not killed or restricted to ghettoes are the Jewish Bielski brothers: Tuvia, Zus, Asael and Aron. Their parents are dead, killed by local  under orders from the German occupiers. The brothers flee to the Naliboki forest, vowing to avenge the deaths of their parents.

The brothers encounter other Jewish escapees hiding in the forest and take them under their protection and leadership. Tuvia kills the  chief responsible for his parents' deaths. Over the next year, they shelter a growing number of refugees, raiding local farms for food and supplies and moving their camp whenever they are discovered. The Bielski brothers stage raids on the Germans and their collaborators. Casualties cause Tuvia to reconsider this approach because of the risk to the hiding Jews. Rivalry between the two eldest brothers, Tuvia and Zus, fuels a disagreement between them about their future; as winter approaches Zus decides to leave the camp and join a local company of Soviet partisans, while his older brother, Tuvia, remains with the camp as their leader. An arrangement is made between the two groups in which the Soviet partisans agree to protect the Jewish camp in exchange for supplies.

After a winter of sickness, starvation, attempted mutiny and constant hiding, the camp learns that the Germans are about to attack them in force. The Soviets refuse to help and they evacuate the camp as  Stukas bomb them. A delaying force stays behind, led by Asael, to slow down the German infantry. The defense does not last long; only Asael and a camp member named Sofiya survive to rejoin the rest of the group, who, at the edge of the forest, are confronted with a seemingly impassable marsh. They cross the marsh with only one casualty but are immediately attacked by a German platoon supported by a Panzer III tank. Just as all seems lost, the Germans are assaulted from the rear by a partisan force led by Zus, who has deserted the Soviets to rejoin the group.

In the epilogue it is revealed that the survivors lived in the forest for another two years, building a hospital, a nursery and a school, growing to a total of 1,200 Jews. Original photographs of the participants are shown, including Tuvia in his uniform, and their fates are described: Asael was conscripted into the Red Army and killed in action, never getting to see the child he fathered; Tuvia, Zus and Aron survived the war and emigrated to the United States to form a trucking firm in New York City. The epilogue also states that the Bielski brothers never sought recognition for what they did and that the descendants of the people they saved now number in the tens of thousands.

Cast

Production
Zwick began writing a script for Defiance in 1999 after he acquired film rights to Tec's book. Zwick developed the project under his production company, the Bedford Falls Company, and the project was financed by the London-based company Grosvenor Park Productions with a budget of $32 million.

In May 2007 actor Daniel Craig was cast in the lead role. Paramount Vantage acquired the rights to distribute Defiance in the United States and Canada.  The following August, Liev Schreiber, Jamie Bell, Alexa Davalos, and Tomas Arana were cast.  Production began in early September 2007 so Craig could complete filming Defiance before moving on to reprising his role as James Bond in Quantum of Solace.

Defiance was filmed in three months in Lithuania, just across the border from Belarus. Co-producer Pieter Jan Brugge felt the shooting locations, between 150 and 200 kilometres from the actual sites, lent authenticity; some local extras were descended from families the group had rescued.

Reception

Critical response
Defiance received mixed reviews from film critics. Rotten Tomatoes reported that 59% of critics gave the film a positive review based upon a sample of 189, with an average score of 5.91/10. The site's consensus states: "Professionally made but artistically uninspired, Ed Zwick's story of Jews surviving WWII in the Belarus forest lacks the emotional punch of the actual history." At Metacritic the film has received an average score of 58/100 based on 34 reviews.

Critic A. O. Scott of The New York Times called the film "stiff, musclebound". He said Zwick "wields his camera with a heavy hand, punctuating nearly every scene with emphatic nods, smiles or grimaces as the occasion requires. His pen is, if anything, blunter still, with dialogue that crashes down on the big themes like a blacksmith's hammer". Scott also said the film unfairly implied that "if only more of the Jews living in Nazi-occupied Europe had been as tough as the Bielskis, more would have survived". The review adds that "in setting out to overturn historical stereotypes of Jewish passivity ...(the film) ends up affirming them."
Zwick responded: "it is a tribute to honor and luck, and to help other people escape it is an honor. But the fact that you don't escape it is not a negative verdict on your honor."

The New Yorker critic David Denby praised the film, saying: "it makes instant emotional demands, and those who respond to it, as I did, are likely to go all the way and even come out of it feeling slightly stunned." Denby praised its performances, which he described as "a kind of realistic fairy tale set in a forest newly enchanted by the sanctified work of staying alive."

A review by Armchair General magazine cited the book Women in the Holocaust by Dalia Ofer and Lenore Weitzman, to argue that in reality the Bielskis were less egalitarian than the film suggests, and that "the fighters had the first pick among women for sexual partners."

Zwick responded to the criticism by saying that Defiance is not a simple fight between good and evil. He told The Times: "The Bielskis weren't saints. They were flawed heroes, which is what makes them so real and so fascinating. They faced any number of difficult moral dilemmas that the movie seeks to dramatise: Does one have to become a monster to fight monsters? Does one have to sacrifice his humanity to save humanity?"

Nechama Tec, on whose book the film is based, stated in an interview with Rzeczpospolita that she was initially shocked by the film, especially by the intense battle scenes including combat with a German tank. These never occurred in reality; the partisans tried to avoid combat and were focused on survival. She explained this as a concession by the producer in order to make the film more thrilling and obtain the necessary funding from Hollywood. Nevertheless, after seeing the film a number of times, Tec said that she was liking it "more and more". Zwick said Adolf Hitler sent two German divisions into the forest to search for the partisans, but they were unable to locate them.

The mention of ampicillin is an anachronism. In one scene, it is stated that there may be an epidemic of typhus, and that ampicillin (which was not discovered until 1958) is needed.

Poland
The Times and The Guardian reported that Poles fear "Hollywood has airbrushed out some unpleasant episodes from the story", such as the Bielski partisans' alleged affiliation with those Soviet partisans directed by the NKVD, who committed atrocities against Poles in eastern Poland, including the region where Bielski's unit operated. Gazeta Wyborcza reported six months before the film's release that "News about a movie glorifying [the Bielskis] have caused an uproar among Polish historians", who referred to the Bielskis as "Jewish-Communist bandits". The newspaper commented that it "departed from the truth on several occasions", including depicting pre-war Nowogrodek as a Belarusian town where "no one speaks Polish", "there are only good Soviet partisans and bad Germans", and "Polish partisans are missing from the film altogether".

According to The Guardian, the movie was booed at some cinemas and banned from others due to a "local perception that it is a rewriting of history and anti-Polish". On March 11, 2009, the Polish Embassy in London disputed the report, stating: "This embassy has been in touch with Defiance's only distributor in Poland, Monolith Plus, and we have been told that this film has not experienced any form of booing, let alone been banned by any cinemas." The wave of criticism against the film led to charges that the anger was fueled by anti-semitism.

Belarus
Most reviewers from Belarus criticized the film for a complete absence of the Belarusian language and for the Soviet partisans singing a Belarusian folk song while they would more likely be singing Russian songs. "The word Belarusian is spoken out only three times in the movie", the newspaper Komsomolskaya Pravda v Belorussii wrote. Veterans of the Soviet partisan resistance in Belarus criticised the film for inaccuracies. Some reviews, as in Poland, criticised the film for ignoring the Bielski partisans' crimes against the local population.

Box office
Defiance made $128,000 during its two weeks of limited release in New York City and Los Angeles. It made $10 million during its first weekend of wide release in the United States, and by the end of its box office run, the film made approximately $52 million worldwide.

Accolades

On January 22, 2009, the film received a nomination for an Academy Award in the category of Best Original Score for its soundtrack by James Newton Howard. It was also nominated for the Golden Globe Award for Best Original Score for 2008.

See also

 List of Holocaust films
 Rescue of Jews by Poles during the Holocaust
 In Darkness - a film dramatising Leopold Socha, a sewer worker in the then Polish city of Lwów, who sheltered Jews in the city's sewer system
 Koniuchy massacre
 Naliboki massacre

References

External links

 
 
 
 Defiance at Metacritic
 
 
 Defiance at Baltic Film Services
 Partisan Interviews at Interviews from the Underground (from "Defiance Movie" site resources)
 Voices on Antisemitism Interview with Daniel Craig from the United States Holocaust Memorial Museum

2008 films
Action films based on actual events
2000s English-language films
2000s Russian-language films
2000s war films
American war films
Eastern Front of World War II films
World War II films based on actual events
Films directed by Edward Zwick
Films set in Belarus
Films set in the 1940s
Films shot in Lithuania
Holocaust films
Paramount Vantage films
Films scored by James Newton Howard
2000s American films